The 2012–13 season was Beitar Jerusalem's 44th season in the Israeli Premier League. Beitar started the season with two victories vs its enemy Hapoel Tel Aviv. 

Chairman Arcadi Gaydamak decided to bring two Muslim-Russian players Zaur Sadayev and Dzhabrail Kadiyev from Terek Grozny FC. This proved controversial with many Beitar fans, and the new signings were subject to verbal abuse from the stands. The hardcore right-wing fan group "La familia" were behind much of this, and organised a boycott for part of the season. 

The two Chechen players signed with Beitar near the top of the table. Their arrival triggered a losing run which eventually left Beitar at the bottom of the table, narrowly avoiding relegation.

First team

Ligat Ha'Al (Premier League)

Regular season

Bottom playoff

State Cup

Toto Cup

Group C

Statistics

Goals

Overall
{|class="wikitable" style="text-align: center;"
|-
!
!Total
!Home
!Away
!Neutral
|-
|align=left| Games played          || 40 || 21 || 19 || 0
|-
|align=left| Games won             || 12 || 6 || 6 || 0
|-
|align=left| Games drawn           || 14 || 8 || 6 || 0
|-
|align=left| Games lost            || 14 || 7 || 7 || 1
|-
|align=left| Biggest win           || 5–0 vs Umm al-Fahm
|-
|align=left| Biggest loss          || 5–0 vs Maccabi Tel Aviv
|-
|align=left| Biggest win (League)  || 3–0 vs Hapoel Haifa
|-
|align=left| Biggest win (Cup)     || 5–0 vs Umm al-Fahm
|-
|align=left| Biggest loss (League) || 5–0 vs Maccabi Tel Aviv
|-
|align=left| Biggest loss (Cup)    || 0-3 vs Maccabi Haifa
|-
|align=left| Clean sheets          || 9 || 5 || 4 || 0
|-
|align=left| Goals scored          || 55 || 29 || 26 || 0
|-
|align=left| Goals conceded        || 63 || 28 || 35 || 0
|-
|align=left| Goal difference       || -8 || +1 || -9 || 0
|-
|-
|-
|align=left| Yellow cards         || 102 || * || * || *
|-
|align=left| Red cards            || 2 || 1 || 1 || 0
|-
|align=left| Most appearances     || align=left| Ariel Harush (39) || colspan=3|–
|-
|align=left| Most goals           || align=left| Avi Reikan (11) || colspan=3|–
|-
|align=left| Most assists         || align=left| Eran Levy (6) || colspan=3|–
|-
|align=left| Points               || 50/120 (%) || 26/63 (%) || 24/57 (%) ||0
|-
|align=left| Winning rate         || % || % || % || 0
|-

Starting 11
4–3–3 formation

References

External links
 Beitar Jerusalem website

Beitar Jerusalem F.C. seasons
Beitar Jerusalem
Beitar Jerusalem
Beitar Jerusalem F.C.